Hee-kyung, also spelled Hui-gyeong, Hui-kyong, or Hi-kyung, is a Korean unisex given name, predominantly feminine. The meaning differs based on the hanja used to write each syllable of the name. There are 25 hanja with the reading "hee" and 54 hanja with the reading "kyung" on the South Korean government's official list of hanja which may be registered for use in given names.

People with this name include:

Artists and writers
Song Hui-gyeong (1376–1446), Joseon Dynasty male scholar and official
Hi Kyung Kim (born 1954), South Korean female composer
Eun Heekyung (born 1959), South Korean female writer
Wendy Hui Kyong Chun (born 1969), American media studies professor

Film and television personalities
Yang Hee-kyung (born 1954), South Korean actress
Moon Hee-kyung (born 1965), South Korean actress
Noh Hee-kyung (born 1966), South Korean female television writer
Jin Hee-kyung (born 1968), South Korean actress

Sportspeople
Wang Hee-kyung (born 1970), South Korean female archer
Park Hui-gyeong (born 1976), South Korean male fencer who competed in the 2004 Olympics
Seo Hee-kyung (born 1986), South Korean female professional golfer

See also
List of Korean given names

References

Korean unisex given names